Powmill is a village in Perth and Kinross, Scotland.

Amenities

The village has a small milk bar which serves hot meals and snacks. It also sells jams and other local produce. Beside the milk barn there is a small garden centre and a gift shop. The milk barn is a popular stop for tourists who are travelling to St Andrews.

It formerly also had a hotel called The Gartwhinzean which burned down in 2012.

Powmill Village Stores is a family-run business in the village; it is a convenience store that serves award-winning pies and cakes from Stuart's the Baker.

References

Villages in Perth and Kinross